Steven Camae Tu'ikolovatu (born June 28, 1991) is a former American football nose tackle. He played college football at Utah before transferring to USC. He is the nephew of Sione Po'uha, a fellow defensive tackle drafted by the New York Jets in 2005.

Professional career
Tu'ikolovatu was drafted by the Tampa Bay Buccaneers in the seventh round, 223rd overall, in the 2017 NFL Draft. He was placed on injured reserve on September 1, 2017.

On August 16, 2018, Tu'ikolovatu was waived/injured by the Buccaneers with a triceps injury and was placed on injured reserve.

On May 29, 2019, the Buccaneers waived Tu'ikolovatu. He was later re-signed on August 7, 2019. He was waived during final roster cuts on August 30, 2019.

References

External links
 USC Trojans bio

1991 births
Living people
American football defensive tackles
Players of American football from Salt Lake City
American people of Tongan descent
Utah Utes football players
USC Trojans football players
Tampa Bay Buccaneers players